Suzanne Lohnes-Croft is a Canadian politician, who was elected to the Nova Scotia House of Assembly in the 2013 provincial election and was re-elected in 2017. A member of the Nova Scotia Liberal Party, she represented the electoral district of Lunenburg until her defeat in the 2021 Nova Scotia general election.

Early life and education

Lohnes-Croft attended the Mahone Bay Consolidated school graduating in 1977. She continued her education at the Mount Saint Vincent University studying Early Childhood education and child development. Before being elected, Lohnes-Croft worked at a daycare as an early childhood educator.

Charity work
In 2010 she received a provincial volunteer award recognizing her years of service to the community and beyond. In 2010 she also received the Representative Volunteer award for the Town of Mahone Bay/Province of Nova Scotia.

Political career
In the 2013 election, Lohnes-Croft captured nearly 37 percent of the vote in the riding of Lunenburg.  In the 2017 election, Lohnes-Croft captured nearly 40 percent of the vote in the riding of Lunenburg.  From 2013 to 2020, Lohnes-Croft served as Deputy Speaker, before becoming Minister of Communities, Culture and Heritage and Gaelic Affairs. Responsible for the Heritage Property Act and the Voluntary Sector.  Lohnes-Croft also is a member of the Standing Committee on Assembly Matters examines the rules, procedures, practices, organization and facilities of the House of Assembly.

As Minister of Communities, Culture and Heritage Lohnes-Croft supported funding for water-related infrastructure projects, through the provincial capital assistance program. Which included the pre-design work for the Salt Marsh project, waterline removal and cleanup of Lepper Brook in Colchester. A study to recommend climate change adaptation measures in Wolfville. A study option to protect Lunenberg's Petite Riviere Watershed from flooding. To assess the condition of a dam on Rory's Brook in Inverness install tide and weather gauges in Bear River, Weymouth, East Ferry, Freeport and Digby. To reconstruct a dangerous area of shoreline on South Street in Lockport.

As Minister Lohnes-Croft supported funding a scholarship honouring internationally acclaimed singer Portia White, honouring her important legacy celebrating her artistry and for ground-breaking achievements in Nova Scotian as a classical singer.

As Minister Lohnes-Croft, provided funds through the province's Emergency Support Program for Arts and Culture. which will help the art community stay afloat while Nova Scotians deal with Convid-19 restrictions. The one-time grant totalling $2.1-million will help make the recovery easier in the future.

Bill introduced of Royal Assent
 Presbyterian Church Legislation, An Act Respecting the Repeal of - Bill 137 
 Lunenburg Common Lands (2017) Act - Bill 36

Electoral record

|-

|Liberal
|Suzanne Lohnes-Croft
|align="right"|3,110
|align="right"|
|align="right"|
|-

|Progressive Conservative
|Brian Pickings
|align="right"|2,425
|align="right"|
|align="right"|
|-

|New Democratic Party
|Marc Breaugh
|align="right"|2,348
|align="right"|
|align="right"|

|}

|-

|Liberal
|Suzanne Lohnes-Croft
|align="right"|3,182
|align="right"|37.81
|align="right"|
|-

|New Democratic Party
|Pam Birdsall
|align="right"|2,768
|align="right"|32.89
|align="right"|
|-

|Progressive Conservative
|Brian Pickings
|align="right"|2,465
|align="right"|29.29
|align="right"|
|}

References

Year of birth missing (living people)
Living people
Nova Scotia Liberal Party MLAs
Women MLAs in Nova Scotia
People from Lunenburg County, Nova Scotia
21st-century Canadian politicians
21st-century Canadian women politicians